The Stolovača is a traditional three-legged wooden chair characteristic of Montenegro, western Serbia, Republika Srpska and Serbian culture.

The Stolovača is low to the ground with a round-back that juts out to the front, to act as arm rests. This chair, which resembles a throne, is traditionally intended for the head of the household, special guests and generally only males.

Today this chair is often found in Etno Villages across Serbia and Montenegro and in traditional restaurants and households.

See also
 Serbian culture
 Montenegrin culture

References

Montenegrin culture
Serbian culture
Chairs
History of furniture
Cultural history of Serbia